Goli Dagh (also Romanized as Golīdāgh and Golī Dāgh; also known as Shahrak-e Golīdāgh) is a village in Golidagh Rural District, Golidagh District, Maraveh Tappeh County, Golestan Province, Iran. At the 2006 census, its population was 1,623, in 343 families.

References 

Populated places in Maraveh Tappeh County